Her First Romance may refer to:
 Her First Romance (1940 film), an American musical comedy film
 Her First Romance (1951 film), an American drama romance film